The squirrelheaded catfish (Arius microcephalus) is a species of sea catfish in the family Ariidae. It was described by Pieter Bleeker in 1855. It inhabits tropical marine and brackish waters in the western Pacific region, including eastern Thailand and Borneo.

References

Arius (fish)
Taxa named by Pieter Bleeker
Fish described in 1855